David Thomas Martin (July 9, 1907 – May 15, 1997) was an American Republican Party politician who served seven terms in the United States House of Representatives from 1961 to 1974.

Martin was born in Kearney, Nebraska and graduated from Dartmouth College in 1929 before entering the lumber business. He was a member of the Nebraska Republican Committee and Republican National Committee in the 1950s; in 1954, he was an unsuccessful primary candidate for United States Senate.

Martin ran for Congress in 1960, defeating freshman Democrat Donald McGinley by a slim margin. He served as minority chairman of House Rules Committee and was also a member of the Education and Labor Committee. He was Ranking Republican on the Rules Committee in his last three terms. He cochaired with Rep. Richard Howard Ichord Jr. of Missouri the Select Committee on the Reorganization of the Congress in 1973-74. In 1974, he was a floor leader in the confirmation of Nelson Rockefeller, his Dartmouth classmate, as Vice President of the United States.

After leaving Congress, Martin became a member of the Nebraska State College Board and was a visiting professor. In 1980, he served as Nebraska chairman for the unsuccessful presidential bid of George H. W. Bush.

Martin died in his hometown of Kearney after suffering from pneumonia and a heart ailment at age 89.

References

External links

1907 births
1997 deaths
People from Kearney, Nebraska
Deaths from pneumonia in Nebraska
Republican Party members of the United States House of Representatives from Nebraska
20th-century American politicians